Reg Libbis (10 June 1933 – 25 May 2009) was an Australian rower. He competed in the men's coxed four event at the 1956 Summer Olympics.

References

1933 births
2009 deaths
Australian male rowers
Olympic rowers of Australia
Rowers at the 1956 Summer Olympics
Rowers from Melbourne
20th-century Australian people